Poultry diseases occur in poultry, which are domesticated birds kept for their meat, eggs or feathers. Poultry species include the chicken, turkey, duck, goose and ostrich.

Viral diseases

 Avian infectious bronchitis, caused by a strain of Avian coronavirus previously known as infectious bronchitis virus
 Avian infectious laryngotracheitis, caused by Gallid alphaherpesvirus 1
 Avian influenza, caused by Avian influenza virus
 Duck plague, caused by Anatid alphaherpesvirus 1
 Chicken infectious anemia, caused by Chicken anaemia virus
 Epidemic tremor, caused by Tremovirus
 Fowlpox, caused by viruses in the genus Avipoxvirus
 Infectious bursal disease (IBD), also known Gumboro disease, caused by Infectious bursal disease virus
 Lymphoid leukosis caused by avian sarcoma leukosis virus
 Marek's disease
 Newcastle disease
 Viral arthritis, caused by Avian reovirus

Parasitic diseases

 Scaly leg, caused by the mite Knemidocoptes mutans
 Infestation by Dermanyssus gallinae, the red poultry mite
 Infestation by Echidnophaga gallinacea, the sticktight flea

Bacterial diseases
 Colibacillosis in poultry
 Infectious coryza in chickens
 Ornithobacterium rhinotracheale
 Pullorum disease
 Riemerella anatipestifer
 Salmonellosis in poultry
 Staphylococcal infection in poultry
 Streptococcal infection in poultry
 Omphalitis in chicks (mushy chick disease)
 Mycoplasmosis
 Fowl cholera
 Campylobacteriosis
 Pseudomonas
 Ornithobacteriosis

Protozoal diseases
 Histomoniasis (blackhead disease), caused by Histomonas meleagridis
 Coccidiosis

Fungal diseases
 Ergotism, which occurs when poultry feed is contaminated with toxic alkaloids produced by fungi of the genus Claviceps
 Aspergillosis, a non-contagious disease caused when birds inhale Aspergillus spores
 Ringworm

References

 
Lists of animal diseases